William Edward McMillon (born November 17, 1971) is an American former professional baseball outfielder. He played in Major League Baseball (MLB) during six seasons between 1996 and 2004, for four different teams. He is an inductee of the International League Hall of Fame.

Since retiring as a player, McMillon has been a coach and manager in Minor League Baseball. He most recently served as manager of the Worcester Red Sox, a Triple-A affiliate of the Boston Red Sox, in 2021. In 2022 he was named development coach for the Rochester RedWings, a Triple-A affiliate of the Washington Nationals.

Early years
McMillon was born in Alamogordo, New Mexico, and graduated from high school in Bishopville, South Carolina. He attended Clemson University where be he played college baseball from 1991 to 1993 for the Tigers, accruing a .382 batting average. He was selected by the Florida Marlins in the eighth round of the 1993 MLB draft.

Playing career
McMillon first played professionally in 1993 for the Elmira Pioneers, a farm team of the Marlins. In 1994, McMillon played for the Kane County Cougars and was selected as a starter for the Midwest League all-star game. In 1995, with the Portland Sea Dogs, then an affiliate of the Marlins, McMillon batted .313 with 14 home runs and 93 runs batted in. He led the Eastern League in hits and walks, with 162 and 96, respectively. He was named an outfielder on the Eastern League postseason all-star team and was named the league's most valuable player. McMillon advanced to Triple-A in 1996; playing for the Charlotte Knights, he was named International League rookie of the year.

McMillon had his major league debut during 1996 with the Marlins, and went on to hit .188 in 41 MLB games during parts of that season and the next. He was traded to the Philadelphia Phillies for Darren Daulton on July 21, 1997. With the Phillies in 1997, McMillon played in 24 games and batted .292 with two home runs and 13 RBIs. He next played in MLB during 2000 and 2001 with the Detroit Tigers, appearing in 66 games while batting .255 with five home runs and 28 RBIs. McMillon's final MLB team was the Oakland Athletics, whom he played for during 2001, 2003, and 2004. With Oakland, he batted .248 with nine home runs and 47 RBIs in 138 games.

Overall, McMillon appeared in a 269 MLB games, batting .248 with 16 home runs and 93 RBIs. He played in three major league postseason games, with Oakland during their loss to the Boston Red Sox in the 2003 American League Division Series, collecting one hit in six at bats. Positionally, he played 133 games as an outfielder, 43 games as a designated hitter, and six games as a first baseman. He had a .974 fielding average as an outfielder.

McMillon also played in a total of 992 minor league games during parts of 11 seasons, with a .304 batting average, 127 home runs, and 610 RBIs. In 2019, McMillon was selected for induction to the International League Hall of Fame.

Managing and coaching career
McMillon joined the Red Sox organization as batting coach of the Single-A Greenville Drive of the South Atlantic League in 2008 and 2009, then became to manager of the Drive in 2010. In two seasons, he led Greenville to a 155–124 record and one playoff appearance.  On January 20, 2012, he was named manager of the Salem Red Sox of the Class A-Advanced Carolina League. After finishing one game under .500 in 2012, he was retained as Salem's manager for the 2013 season and led his team  to the Carolina League championship. Salem won the second half Southern Division title, and then bested the Myrtle Beach Pelicans and the Potomac Nationals in the playoffs. The Salem Red Sox won their final 11 games during the regular season and playoffs.

On December 18, 2013, McMillon was named manager of the Portland Sea Dogs, the Red Sox' affiliate in the Double-A Eastern League and the team that he had played for (with the Marlins) in 1995. His managerial debut with the 2014 Sea Dogs produced a first-place finish in the Eastern League's Northern Division with an 88–54 record. McMillon was named the league's manager of the year. During the season, his club included top prospects such as Mookie Betts, Blake Swihart, Henry Owens, Deven Marrero, Brian Johnson, Eduardo Rodríguez and Travis Shaw; all but Rodríguez were promoted to higher levels by the time of the Eastern League playoffs, when Portland fell to the Binghamton Mets in the first round. McMillon was subsequently retained by the Sea Dogs as their manager for the 2015 season; the team finished with a 53–89 record.

McMillon spent 2016 to 2018 as the roving minor league outfield and base running coordinator in the Red Sox' farm system.

In December 2018, McMillon returned to managing, becoming the 18th manager of the Pawtucket Red Sox in the team's Triple-A history, and 21st overall since the team was established as a Double-A franchise in 1970. The 2019 PawSox finished with a record of 59–81. McMillon returned as manager for 2020, but the minor league season was cancelled due to the COVID-19 pandemic. McMillon became the first manager of the Worcester Red Sox, which succeeded Pawtucket as Boston's Triple-A affiliate in 2021.

Managerial record

Personal life
McMillon holds a bachelor's degree from Clemson and an MBA from the University of Phoenix. He and his wife and two children reside in Columbia, South Carolina.

References

External links

1971 births
Living people
People from Alamogordo, New Mexico
African-American baseball managers
African-American baseball players
Baseball coaches from South Carolina
Baseball players from New Mexico
Baseball players from South Carolina
Florida Marlins players
Philadelphia Phillies players
Detroit Tigers players
Oakland Athletics players
Major League Baseball outfielders
Clemson Tigers baseball players
Charlotte Knights players
Columbus Clippers players
Elmira Pioneers players
Kane County Cougars players
Portland Sea Dogs players
Sacramento River Cats players
Scranton/Wilkes-Barre Red Barons players
Toledo Mud Hens players
Greenville Drive managers
Salem Red Sox managers
Pawtucket Red Sox managers
Portland Sea Dogs managers
Worcester Red Sox managers
University of Phoenix alumni
21st-century African-American sportspeople
20th-century African-American sportspeople